

Background 
San Leonardo, officially the Municipality of San Leonardo, is a 1st class municipality in the province of Nueva Ecija, Philippines. According to the 2020 census, it has a population of 68,536 people.

The municipality has a land area of 151.90 square kilometers or 58.65 square miles which constitutes 2.67% of Nueva Ecija's total area. This represented 2.97% of the total population of Nueva Ecija province, or 0.55% of the overall population of the Central Luzon region. Based on these figures, the population density is computed at 451 inhabitants per square kilometer or 1,169 inhabitants per square mile.

San Leonardo is located between Gapan and Santa Rosa along the Maharlika Highway. The area has a farming economy. San Leonardo has vast rice fields and land for growing vegetables and poultry products.

History
During World War II, Imperial Japanese forces sacked San Leonardo in 1942 during the opening stages of the Japanese Occupation. Novo Ecijano and Hukbalahap Communist guerrilla resistance groups from 1942 to 1944 in the town fought the invaders, with liberation coming in 1945 by the Allied troops.
 
From January to April 1945, the combined military force of the Philippine Commonwealth Army, Philippine Constabulary, and the United States Army recaptured and liberated the town. The joint forces assisted the Novo Ecijano and Hukbalahap Communist resistance groups and defeat the Japanese soldiers and officers under the Imperial Japanese Armed Forces and the Makapili soldiers and begins the Battle of San Leonardo and the Battle of Gapan between the Japanese and the combined American and Philippine Commonwealth troops on January to April 1945 and ended World War II.

Geography

Barangays
San Leonardo is politically subdivided into 15 barangays.

Climate

Demographics

Religion
Majority of populace is Roman Catholic. Other religious groups have churches and places of worship in the municipality.
St. Bartholomew the Apostle Parish Church
Pentecostal Missionary Church of Christ (4th Watch) - Brgy. Diversion
Bethel United Methodist Church
Magpapalayok Catholic Church
Saint John Marie Vianney Parish
St. Jude Thaddeus of Nueva Ecija
Church Of Christ Locale Of Castellano
Iglesia Ni Cristo - Lokal ng San Leonardo
Iglesia Ni Cristo Lokal ng Nieves
Jesus Christ to God be the Glory Church International
Leap of Faith Christian Church
United Pentecostal Church -San Leonardo
Victory Churches of Asia Incorporated

Economy 

Primarily depends on rice cultivation, vegetable production, poultry, piggery & commercial fishery.

Education

Public elementary schools
 C.I. Villaroman ES (Formerly Magpapalayok Elementary School)
 Castellano Elementary School
 Mallorca Elementary School
 Mambangnan Elementary School
 Nieves Elementary School
 San Anton Elementary School
 San Leonardo Central School
 San Roque Elementary School
 Tagumpay Elementary School
 Tambo North Elementary School
 Tambo South Elementary School

Public high schools
 Magpapalayok National High School
 Mallorca National High School
 Mambangnan National High School
 San Anton National High School
 Tagumpay Nagaño High School

Tertiary
 Nueva Ecija University of Science and Technology - San Leonardo Campus

Private schools
 Akarui Technical School Foundation
 Clever Lane Montessori School
 Dr. Gloria D. Lacson Foundation Colleges
 Lasaltech Academy
 San Leonardo Academy
 San Lorenzo Ruiz Diocesan Academy
 Seraphin Learning Center
 Trinity Christian School (TCS)

Healthcare
Hospitals and clinics can be found for their check up and treatment.
Dr. Gloria D. Lacson General Hospital
Nueva Ecija Medical Center
 South Ecija Doctors Hospital

Gallery

References

External links

The Official Website of San Leonardo, Nueva Ecija
 [ Philippine Standard Geographic Code]
Philippine Census Information
Local Governance Performance Management System

Municipalities of Nueva Ecija
Populated places on the Pampanga River